LittleThings is a digital media firm that published positive, uplifting stories geared towards American women. LittleThings attracted its following primarily through distributing its content on Facebook targeting a female audience.

In 2015, LittleThings had the most popular Facebook post.

On February 27, 2018, LittleThings announced it was shutting down, citing Facebook's algorithm shift taking out 75% of their organic traffic.

On April 10, 2018, LittleThings was acquired by RockYou Media, an entertainment and media company aimed at millennials. RockYou Media relaunched of LittleThings.

References

Online mass media companies of the United States
Internet properties established in 2015
Viral videos
American women's websites